This is a list of television programs broadcast by the Canadian Broadcasting Corporation's French language television network, Ici Radio-Canada Télé. For programs on the CBC's English network, see List of programs broadcast by CBC Television.

#
 0340
 14, rue de Galais (1954-1957)
 19-2 (2011-2015)
 30 vies (2011-2016)
 3600 secondes d'extase

A
 À cause de mon oncle
 Albator, le corsaire de l'espace
 ALF
 Animaniacs
 Arthur
 Astro Boy
 Au nom de la loi (2005)
 Aux portes du cauchemar
 Au pays de l'arc-en-ciel
 L'auberge du chien noir
 Les Aventures de Seaspray

B
 Bagatelle
 Ballades et chansons
 La Bande à Ovide
 Barbapapa
 Beau temps, mauvais temps
 Beautés désespérées
 Les Beaux Dimanches (1966-2004)
 Les Belles Histoires des pays d'en haut (1956-1970)
 Bob l'éponge
 Bobino
 Bonjour Sesame (1975-1976)
 La bonne aventure
 Les Bougon
 Les Boys
 Les Brigades du Tigre
 Les Brûlés
 Bugs Bunny
 Bye Bye

C
 C.A.
 Les Cadets de la forêt
 Canada Vignettes
 Candy 
 Capitaine Caverne
 Catherine
 Ce soir, on chante
 C'est comme ça que je t'aime
 Chapeau melon et bottes de cuir
 Chartrand et Simonne
 Cher Oncle Bill
 Les Chiboukis
 Cineastes de la faune
 Cirques du Monde
 Columbo
 Conseil-express
 Les Coqueluches
 Cosmos: 1999
 Les Coulisses du pouvoir
 Coup d'oeil
 Cover Girl (2005)
 Le Crime d'Ovide Plouffe

D
 D'Amour et d'eau fraiche
 D'hier à demain
 Daktari
 Dallas
 Daniel Boone
 Déclic
 Défi
 Découverte 
 De ville en ville
 Demetan, la Petite Grenouille
 Discussions avec mes parents
 Dre Grey, leçons d'anatomie
 Du coeur au ventre
 Duplessis

E
 Empire, Inc.
 Les Enfants du 47A
 Enquête
 L'épicerie
 Et Dieu créa... Laflaque
 Un été dans le grand nord
 Les étoiles filantes

F
 La facture
 La famille Plouffe
 Fanfreluche
 Félix et Ciboulette
 La Femme Bionique
 La femme d'aujourd'hui
 Fifi Brindacier
 Les Filles de Caleb
 Les Filles du Ciel
 La fine cuisine d'Henri Bernard
 Fleurs d'amour, fleurs d'amitié
 La Fosse aux lionne
 Fraggle Rock
 Francoeur
 Le Fric Show
 La Fureur

G
 Galactica
 Un gars, une fille
 Génies en herbe
 Goldorak 
 Grand-Papa
 Grands rires
 La Grosse vie

H
 Les hauts et les bas de Sophie Paquin
 Les Héros du samedi
 Une heure sur terre
 Homme d'araignée: la nouvelle série de dessin animé

I
 Il était une fois... l'Homme
 L'Incroyable Hulk
 Infoman
 Les Invincibles

J
 Jamais deux sans toi
 La Job
 Les Jordache
 Le Jour du Seigneur

K
 Kif-Kif

L
 Lâcher prise (2017–present)
 Lance et Compte
 Lassie
 Lingo

M
 M pour musique
 Madame est servie
 Madame et son fantôme 
 Magazine Culturel
 La Maison-Bleue
 La Maison de Ouimzie
 Marcus Welby
 Marguerite Volant
 Le match des étoiles
 Moi et l'autre
 Le moment de vérité
 Mona le vampire
 Le Monde en liberté
 Montreal Pop Concerts
 Les Moomins
 Le Muppet Show
 Les Muppets
 Le Mutant

N
 Nic et Pic
 Le nouveau show
 Nouvelle adresse

O
 L'Odyssée sous-marine de Jacques Cousteau
 Omerta

P
 Paquet voleur
 Les Parent 
 Passe-Partout
 Passion sports
 Patrouille du cosmos: série de dessin animé
 Petite merveille
 La Petite Patrie
 La Petite Vie
 Les Pierrafeu
 Le Point
 Point de mire
 Le Prince Saphir
 Propos et confidences
 Providence

R
 Les Recettes de Juliette
 Rencontres
 Les Rescapés
 Ricardo
 Robinson Suisse
 Rocquet Belles Oreilles
 Le roi Leo
 Roxy
 Rue des Pignons

S
 Samedi de rire
 Scooby-Doo
 Second Regard
 La Semaine Verte
 Série noire
 Les Simpson
 La Soirée du hockey
 Sol et Gobelet
 Sous le signe du lion
 Sporthèque
 Les Supers Nanas
 Sur la côte du Pacifique
 Sur le vif

T
 Tarzan
 Le Téléjournal
 Terre humaine
 Les Tisserands du pouvoir
 Toc toc toc
 Tom et Jerry
 Tortues Ninja, les chevaliers d'écaille
 Toumai
 Tout le monde en parle
 Trauma
 Les Trouvailles de Clémence

U
 L'Union fait la force
 Unité 9
 Univers inconnus
 Urgences

V
 Le Vagabond
 Véro
 La Vie qui bat
 La vie secrète des animaux
 Virginie
 Vivre à trois

W
 Walt Disney présente
 Walter et Tandoori
 Watatatow (1991-2005)
 Wickie
 Woody le Pic

Y
 Yogi et compagnie
 Yogi l'Ours

See also
List of Canadian television series

References

External links
Société Radio-Canada Television (SRC) Programming through the years - Canadian Communications Foundation

Radio-Canada